Mardie may refer to:
 Mardie Station, in the Pilbara region of Western Australia;
 Mardié, in the Loiret department in north-central France;
 Mardie Cornejo, born 1951, a US baseball player